Gwalior() is a major city in the central Indian state of Madhya Pradesh; it lies in northern part of Madhya Pradesh and is one of the Counter-magnet cities. The historic city and its fortress have been ruled by several historic Indian kingdoms. From the Kachchhapaghatas in the 10th century, Tomars in the 13th century, it was passed on to the Mughal Empire, then to the Maratha in 1754, and the Scindia Dynasty of Maratha Empire in the 18th century. In April 2021, It was found that Gwalior had the best air quality index (AQI 152) amongst the 4 major cities in Madhya Pradesh.

Besides being the administrative headquarters of Gwalior district and Gwalior division, Gwalior has many administrative offices of the Chambal division of northern Madhya Pradesh. Several administrative and judicial organisations, commissions and boards have their state and national headquarters situated in the city.

Gwalior was the winter capital of the state of Madhya Bharat which later became a part of the larger state of Madhya Pradesh. Prior to Indian independence on 15 August 1947, Gwalior remained a princely state of the British Raj with the Scindia as the local rulers. High rocky hills surround the city from all sides, on the north it just forms the border of the Ganga- Yamuna Drainage Basin. The city however is situated in the valley between the hills. Gwalior's metropolitan area includes Gwalior city centre, Morar Cantonment, Lashkar Gwalior (Lashkar Subcity), Maharaj Bada, Phool Bagh, and Thatipur.

Gwalior was one of the major locations of rebellion during the 1857 uprising. Post-independence, Gwalior has emerged as an important tourist attraction in central India while many industries and administrative offices came up within the city. Before the end of the 20th century it became a million plus agglomeration and now it is a metropolitan city in central India. Gwalior is surrounded by industrial and commercial zones of neighbouring districts (Malanpur – Bhind, Banmore – Morena) on all three main directions.

Gwalior has been selected as one of the hundred Indian cities to be developed as a smart city under PM Narendra Modi's flagship Smart Cities Mission.

History

According to legend, Gwalior was founded in 8 CE after a local chieftain, Suraj Sen who was cured of leprosy from a drink given to him by a holy man called Gwalipa. Suraj subsequently set up a town and fort and named them after Gwalipa.

The earliest historical record found at Gwalior is the Gwalior inscription of the Alchon Hun ruler Mihirakula. It describes Mihirakula's father Toramana (493-515) as "a ruler of the earth, of great merit, who was renowned by the name of the glorious Tôramâna; by whom, through (his) heroism that was specially characterized by truthfulness, the earth was governed with justice", and his Mihirakula as "the lord of the earth" as of 520 CE.

Around the 9th century, the Gurjara-Pratihara dynasty controlled Gwalior and during their rule, they constructed the Teli ka Mandir temple. The Kachchhapaghata dynasty ruled the area c.950 –c.1192 CE, leaving remarkable architectural works such as the Sasbahu Temple. In 1021, Gwalior was attacked by forces led by Mahmud Ghazni but they were repelled.

In 1231 Iltutmish, ruler of the Mamluk dynasty of the Delhi Sultanate, captured Gwalior after an 11-month-long effort and from then till the 13th century it remained under Muslim rule. In 1375, Raja Veer Singh was made the ruler of Gwalior and he founded the rule of the Tomar clan. During those years, Gwalior saw its golden period.

The Jain Sculptures at Gwalior Fort were built under Tomar rule. Man Singh Tomar made his dream palace, the Man Mandir Palace which is now a tourist attraction at Gwalior Fort. Babur described it as "the pearl in the necklace of forts of India and not even the winds could touch its masts". The daily light and sound show organised there apprise about the history of the Gwalior Fort and Man Mandir Palace. By the 15th century, the city had a noted singing school which was attended by the prominent figure of Hindustani classical music, Tansen. After death of Mughal Emperor Aurangzeb the Jat ruler Bhim Singh Rana captured Gwalior from Mughals. Later in the 1830s, the Scindia Dynastys captured Gwalior and it remained a princely state during the period of British rule.

Chaturbhuj Temple at Gwalior Fort claims the world's very first occurrence of zero as a written number.

Rebellion of 1857 
Gwalior is also known for not participating in the 1857 rebellion, mainly due to non-co-operation with Rani Lakshmibai. After Kalpi (Jhansi) fell into the hands of the British on 24 May 1858, Lakshmibai sought shelter at Gwalior Fort. The Maharaja of Gwalior, Jayajirao Scindia, was not willing to give up his fort without a fight as he was a strong ally of the British, but after negotiations, his troops capitulated and the rebels took possession of the fort. The British attacked Gwalior in no time, the battle was fought by Lakshmibai. Indian forces numbered around 20,000, and British forces around 1,600 troops. Lakshmibai's example is remembered to this day by Indian nationalists. She died fighting, and Gwalior was free from rebels. There is a statue of Lakshmibai on her horse which commemorates her contribution to the fight for independence. Tantia Tope and Rao Sahib escaped. Tantia Tope was later captured and hanged in April 1859.

Princely state of Gwalior

Scindia is a Maratha clan in India. This clan included rulers of the Gwalior State in the 18th and 19th centuries, who were a princely states during the period of British colonial rule during the 19th and the 20th centuries until India became independent, and politicians in independent India.

The Scindia state of Gwalior became a major regional power in the second half of the 18th century and figured prominently in the three Anglo-Maratha Wars. (Gwalior first fell to the British in 1780.) The Scindias held significant power over many of the Rajput states, and conquered the state of Ajmer. During the Indian Rebellion of 1857, the city was briefly held by rebel forces in 1858 until they were defeated by the British. The Scindia family ruled Gwalior until India's independence from the United Kingdom in 1947, when the Maharaja Jivajirao Scindia acceded to the Government of India. Gwalior was merged with a number of other princely states to become the new Indian state of Madhya Bharat. Jivajirao Scindia served as the state's Rajpramukh, or the appointed governor, from 28 May 1948 to 31 October 1956, when Madhya Bharat was merged into Madhya Pradesh.

In 1962, Rajmata Vijayraje Scindia, the widow of Maharaja Jivajirao Scindia, was elected to the Lok Sabha, beginning the family's career in electoral politics. She was first a member of the Congress Party, and later became an influential member of the Bharatiya Janata Party. Her son, Maharaja Madhavrao Scindia was elected to the Lok Sabha in 1971 representing the Congress Party, and served until his death in 2001. His son, Jyotiraditya Scindia, also in the Congress Party, was elected to the seat formerly held by his father in 2004, but later joined Bhartiya janata Party in 2020.

Demographics

As of the 2011 Census of India, Gwalior had a population of 1,054,420. Males constitute 53% of the population and females 47%. Gwalior has an average literacy rate of 84.14%, higher than the national average of 74%: male literacy is 89.64% and female literacy is 77.92%. In Gwalior, about 11% of the population is under 6 years of age. The city's metropolitan population, which includes the commuter town of Morar Cantonment, was 1,102,884.

Religion

Hinduism is practiced by the majority of the people in Gwalior (88.84%). Other religions practised include Islam (8.58%), Jainism (1.41%), Sikhism (0.56%), Christianity (0.29). Gwalior has a long history of religious amity. The erstwhile Maharajas of the Scindia dynasty considered the Sufi saints to be their gurus and headed the Muharram procession every year.

Languages
Hindi is by far the predominant language of Gwalior with nearly 96% of residents speaking it as their first language. Sindhi and Marathi are spoken by 1% each.

Geography 

It has an average elevation of 197 metres (646 feet). Most part of it comes under the Gird area.

Location

Waterways 

The Tigra Dam is located on the outskirts of the city. The dam is now being used to store water from the Sank river and supply water to the city. The reservoir is used for leisure activities including speed boating, paddle boating, and water scooters.

The Swarna Rekha river is a reconstructed part of the Swarna Rekha river which was dried during the British raj. Boat rides run between Padav in central Gwalior to Gwalior Zoo.

Parks and gardens 

The Lashkar part of Gwalior has many parks, including the Phool Bagh, or the garden of flowers, built to welcome the Prince of Cambridge and the Italian Garden – the garden which was used by the Scindias as a place of relaxation, is Italian in architecture with a water pool surrounded by musical fountains. Ambedkar Park and Gandhi Park are other prominent parks.

Gwalior Zoo provides a home for white tigers, serpents, golden pheasants, sambar, hyena, bison, and others.

Climate

Gwalior has a sub-tropical climate with hot summers from late March to early July, the humid monsoon season from late June to early October, and a cool dry winter from early November to late February. Under Köppen's climate classification the city has a humid subtropical climate. The highest recorded temperature was 48 °C and the lowest was −1 °C. Summers start in late March, and along with other cities like Jaipur and Delhi, are among the hottest in India and the world. Temperatures peak in May and June with daily averages being around 33–35 °C (93–95 °F), and end in late June with the onset of the monsoon. Gwalior receives 900 mm (35 in) of rain on average per year, most of which is concentrated in the Monsoon months (from late June to early October). August is the wettest month with about 310 mm (12 in) of rain. Winter in Gwalior starts in late October, and is generally very mild with daily temperatures averaging in the 14–16 °C (58–62 °F) range, and mostly dry and sunny conditions. January is the coldest month with average lows in the 5-6 °C range (41-42 °F) and occasional cold snaps that plummet temperatures down to a single digit.

Environment
Gwalior was found to have the second-highest level of air pollution according to a World Health Organization study in 2016. Particulates from the burning of garbage and fossil fuels make breathing the of this city a hazard.

Government

The administration of Gwalior is shared between the departments and institutions of three levels of government – civic administration by the Gwalior Municipal Corporation, state administration by government of Madhya Pradesh, and the central government of India.

The judiciary has four levels: the lowest level being the Gwalior Gram panchayat (or "Gram Nyayalaya"). Above the gram panchayat is the District Court for Gwalior district sits Lashkar. Above that, the Madhya Pradesh High Court has its main seat in Jabalpur, but also a permanent bench in Gwalior city. The final court of appeal is the Supreme Court of India.

Gwalior Municipal Corporation

The Gwalior Municipal Corporation is responsible for the civic infrastructure and administration of the city, which is divided into 66 wards.

Vivek Narayan Shejwalkar was the mayor of Gwalior Municipal Corporation before becoming a Member of Parliament as a Bharatiya Janta Party in the 2019 Lok sabha elections. Now there is no Mayor for Gwalior as of August 2019.
The Municipal Commissioner, a member of the Indian Administrative Service, is responsible for the corporations finances and for the services and works conducted for the city.

The municipality was created on 6 June 1887 with two divisions for Lashkar and Morar, which later were merged with a single constitutional body.

State government 

There are four seats in the state legislative assembly (the "Madhya Pradesh Vidhan Sabha") responsible for the Gwalior municipal area, the constituencies being Gwalior, Gwalior Rural, Gwalior East and Gwalior South. Prior to the 2008 boundary changes the seats were "Gird", "Lashkar East" and "Lashkar West".

State institutions include:
 Office of The President-Board of Revenue of Madhya Pradesh
 Office of The Transport-Commissioner of Madhya Pradesh
 Office of The Commissioner-Land Records & Settlements Madhya Pradesh
 Office of The State Excise Commissioner of Madhya Pradesh

Central government
The national assembly seat covering Gwalior is the Gwalior (Lok Sabha constituency). The seat was held by Narendra Singh Tomar of the BJP.

In May 2019, Vivek Narayan Shejwalkar of Bharatiya Janata Party had been elected as the Member of Parliament from Gwalior.

Central government institutions include:
 Office of The Accountant-General (AG) of Madhya Pradesh
 Defense Research & Development Establishment (DRDE)
 Border Security Force (BSF) Academy
 National Cadet Corps (NCC) Officer's Training Academy (OTA)
 Indian Air Force (IAF) Station (Maharajpura Airbase). 
 Office of The Narcotics Commissioner of India (Central Bureau of Narcotics)
 Central Intelligence Bureau HO
 laxmibai National Institute of physical Education (LNIPE)
 Indian Army Cantonment (Morar Cantonment)
 Central Reserve Police Force (CRPF) ([Shivpuri Link Road Ghatigao Gwalior)]
 Central Potato Research Institute, Gwalior
Centre for Advanced Maintenance Technology (Ministry of Railways)

Transport and connectivity

Railway Station Gwalior

Gwalior is a major railway junction in the Northern central region. The Gwalior Junction (Station code: GWL) is the part of the North Central Railways. Gwalior is one of the few places where both narrow gauge and broad gauge railways tracks are operational. Gwalior is the terminus for the longest narrow gauge route operating in the world, covering a distance of 198 km from Gwalior Junction to Sheopur. Gwalior Junction is a five railway track intersection point. It won an award for the best and cleanest station of North Central Railway zone.

 Goes to Agra (AGC)
 Goes to Jhansi (JHS)
 Goes to Shivpuri (SVPI)
 Goes to Etawah (ETW)
 Goes to Sheopur Kalan (SOE) on Narrow Gauge Line

Gwalior is one of the major commercial railway stations of the North Central Railway, whose zone headquarters is centred in Allahabad. The station has won awards from Indian Railways for excellent clean infrastructure in 1987, 1988, 1989 and 1992. It is in the Adarsh Station Category of Indian Railways.

Gwalior Light Railway connects to the Kuno Wildlife Sanctuary in Sheopur. It is the junction point to reach tourist destinations like Shivpuri, Dholpur and Bhind.
Gwalior is on the Main train line between Delhi (station code: NDLS) and Mumbai (Bombay) (CSTM) and between Delhi and Chennai (MAS).
 
Some trains starting here and travelling towards Eastern India via Gwalior Junction – Jhansi Junction provide direct connections to points in eastern India including Kolkata, Barauni, Varanasi, and Allahabad. There are about fifty trains to New Delhi and Agra every day, and around the same number of trains to the Bhopal and Nagpur stations. However, fewer trains are available for long routes like Mumbai and Chennai. The luxury trains – the Maharaja Express and the India on Wheels – stop at Gwalior on their week-long round trip of tourist destinations in Central India. More than 180 trains stop at Gwalior Railway Station

Road
Gwalior is fairly well connected to other parts of Madhya Pradesh and India by national and state highways. The proposed North-south-Corridor of the Golden-Quadrilateral Highway project passes through the city. The Agra-Bombay national highway (NH3) passes through Gwalior, connecting it to Shivpuri on one end and Agra on the other. The Yamuna Expressway is easily accessible from Agra for the travelers going to New Delhi.

The city is connected to the Jhansi by the National Highway 75, towards the south of the city. The northern part of the city is connected to the city of Mathura via National Highway 3. There are bus services to and from all major and minor cities near Gwalior, including Bhopal, Agra, Delhi, Jabalpur, Jhansi, Bhind, Morena, Dholpur, Etawah, Datia, Jaipur, and Indore.

Airport
Gwalior Airport , also called Rajamata Vijaya Raje Scindia Airport, is the airport of Gwalior. It has an Indian Air Force Base which stations Mirage fighters. Daily flights to Delhi, Kolkata, Hyderabad, Banglore, Mumbai, Pune , Ahemdabad, Jaipur, Indore, and Jammu are available from Gwalior airport.

Local public transport
Gwalior's public transport system mainly consists of Tempos, auto rickshaw taxis, Ola Cabs, and micro-buses. The Municipal Corporation's "Gwalior City Bus" covers some routes in the city. Blue Radio taxis are also available in Gwalior. The Tempos and auto rickshaws are often cited as a cause of pollution and road congestion, and the local government has plans to replace the Tempos with vans that will run on liquefied petroleum gas. In 2018, a 3 km cycle track was built in the city, and the city became the fourth in India to have this type of facility.

The Gwalior Metro is the proposed project for Gwalior city. The project was announced by state CM Shivraj Singh Chouhan on 17 October 2014. Hence district administration is preparing a DPR(Detailed Project Report) for The Gwalior Metro.

Culture

Art and literature
Gwalior holds a major and a special position in the Indian classical music, art and literature. Gwalior is a well acknowledged place of art, associated with historic as well as contemporary evidence. In August 2005 a mural created by Aasutosh Panigrahi and five other artists was acknowledged as the World's Largest Indoor Mural by Guinness World Records. Marathi Sahitya Sammelan, the conference on Marathi Literature was held in Gwalior in 1961. It was presided over by writer Kusumavati Deshpande (herself a poet and also the wife of Kavi Anil). She was the first female president of the annual Sammelan since its inception in 1878. Culturally Gwalior is the confluence of two rich cultures Bundeli and Braj.

In more recent times, Akhtar family has been based out of Gwalior for at least three generations with Muztar Khairabadi, his son Jan Nisar Akhtar and his grandson Javed Akhtar being the prominent literary figures. Nida Fazli, one of the most famous Indian Hindi and Urdu poets grew up here. Former Indian Prime Minister, Atal Bihari Vajpayee, is also a well known writer and poet.

Music
Raja Man Singh Tomar, the King of Gwalior between 1486 and 1516 CE, was a patron of Drupad (Hindi: ध्रुपद). Dhrupad is a vocal genre in Hindustani classical music, said to be the oldest still-in-use in that musical tradition. Its name is derived from the words "dhruva" (fixed) and "pada" (words). The term may denote both the verse form of the poetry and the style in which it is sung.

Gwalior holds a major position in the Indian classical music, with being the birthplace of the oldest Hindustani sangeet gharana – Gwalior Gharana. Gwalior holds an unparalleled reputation in Sangeet and has retained Indian traditions and the wealth of music intact over the years. The Gwalior Gharana is not only the oldest Khyal Gharana but it is also one of the most prominent gharana being the one to which most classical Indian musicians can trace the origin of their style. The rise of the Gwalior Gharana started with the reign of the great Mughal emperor Akbar (1542–1605). Akbar's favourite singer was Tansen, who came from the Gwalior area and whose ashes were buried in Gwalior after his death. The Tansen Tomb in Gwalior was constructed in his remembrance. Tansen Festival started in the 1930s, and currently artists from all over India come to perform in the festival.

Baijnath Prasad (also known as Baiju Bawra) was a classical singer (Dhrupadiya) who lived in Gwalior for his whole life under the patronage of Man Singh. Baiju was born in Chanderi and was cremated there. He received his musical training in Vrindaban under Swami Guru Haridas Ji. He was the court musician of Gwalior along with Nayak Charju, Bakshu, and others.

Sarod player Amjad Ali Khan is also from Gwalior. His grandfather, Ghulam Ali Khan Bangash, became a court musician in Gwalior.

Tansen Music Festival 
The Tansen Sangeet Samaroh (Tansen Music Festival) is celebrated every year on the Tansen Tomb in Gwalior during the month of December. Tansen Samaroh is a platform where artists from all over India gather and participate to deliver vocal and instrumental performances. The Tansen Sangeet Samaroh is organised by the government of Madhya Pradesh, in association with the Academy of the Department of Culture. During the festival, music lovers and artists from all over the world gather to offer their tribute to Tansen. The academy offers honours to senior celebrities and junior artists by including them in the Samaroh through their performed music.

Sarod Ghar 
This Museum of Music has been set up in the old ancestral house of musician Hafiz Ali Khan. It houses ancient instruments of the Indian masters of the past. It also houses a collection of photographs and documents. Sarod Ghar is an institution devoted to promoting Indian classical music, heritage and culture. Through this 'window' to the past, music lovers can gain a better understanding of the evolution and history of Indian classical music and a deeper perspective and insight into the context of the art as it exists today.

Media and communication

There are newspapers, magazines, local TV stations and four FM radio stations in Gwalior.

Patrika is the leading newspaper and Dainik Bhaskar is one of the oldest and most widely read newspapers. Swadesh and Naidunia are other well-established newspapers. More newspapers published in Gwalior are BPN Times, Raj Express, Dainik Madhya Raj, Nav Bharat, Youth Engine, Dainik Jagran, People's Samachar, Dainik Adityaz. Evening newspapers are Sandhya Samachaar, Gwalior Sandesh, Sudarshan Express.

"Aalekh-Life in Pages" is one of the leading youth magazine published and widely read across the city. SouLSteer magazine is a bi-monthly lifestyle and automotive magazine in Gwalior.

The radio industry has expanded with private FM channels being introduced. The FM radio channels that broadcast in the city include Big FM (92.7 MHz), Red FM (93.5), Chaska FM (95 MHz), My FM (94.3 MHz), and Lemon (91.9 MHz). The state-owned company, Doordarshan, transmits two terrestrial television channels. Major local channels include Hathway Win, Harsh Networks, KMJ Communications, and DEN networks.

Sports 
Lakshmibai National University for Physical Education (operational since 1957) is the largest physical education institutions in Asia. Gwalior also has the Railway Hockey Stadium with artificial turf. Captain Roop Singh Stadium is a cricket ground with a capacity of 45,000. The stadium has hosted 10 One Day International (ODI) matches. Of the ten matches played so far, the first one was played between India and West Indies on 22 January 1988. The ground has flood lights and has also hosted day-night encounters. One match of the 1996 Cricket World Cup was also played on this ground, between India and West Indies.

Dhyan Chand was a famous hockey player from Jhansi which is near Gwalior. Ankit Sharma is a cricketer from Gwalior and plays in the Indian Premier League. Athletics are also played in this city, Vishal Kaim was the youngest hammer thrower of India when he participated in National Athletics Games in 2006 at the age of 14 years.

Stadium and Sports University 

 Captain Roop Singh Stadium is a cricket ground in Gwalior. The stadium has hosted ten One Day International (ODI) matches. Of the ten matches played so far, the first one was played between India and West Indies on 22 January 1988. It can hold 45,000 people at a time. It was originally a hockey stadium named after great Indian hockey player Roop Singh, brother of hockey player Dhyan Chand. The ground has flood lights and has hosted day-night encounters as well. One match of the 1996 Cricket World Cup was also played on this ground, between India and West Indies. This ground is notable for hosting the ODI between India and South Africa in which Sachin Tendulkar scored the first-ever double century in ODI cricket.
 The Lakshmibai National University of Physical Education (LNIPE), Gwalior was established by the Ministry of Education & Culture, Government of India as Lakshmibai College of Physical Education (LCPE) in August 1957, the centenary year of the War of Independence. It is located at Gwalior, where Rani Lakshmibai of Jhansi, a heroine of the war, died during the rebellion in 1857. The Institute started as an affiliated college of the Vikram University, Ujjain and then came to the folds of Jiwaji University, Gwalior in 1964. The institute was given the status of National importance, and hence it was renamed as Lakshmibai National College of Physical Education (LNCPE) in 1973. In recognition of its unique status and character and to facilitate its further growth, the college was conferred the status of an ′Autonomous College′ of Jiwaji University, Gwalior in 1982.
 A new international stadium at Shankarpur village near Ghatigaon tehsil has been proposed by Madhya Pradesh Cricket Association (MPCA). The proposed stadium will be built on a land of 30 acres, which has been taken over by Gwalior District Cricket Association (GDCA). The construction of the proposed stadium is expected to be completed in 2020. It will have a seating capacity of around 100,000 spectators. It will also be equipped with flood lights for night matches, a swimming pool, sauna bath, modern gym, dressing room, and 30 corporate boxes.

Education 

Gwalior has developed into a significant centre of education. It hosts several prominent government and private universities and institutions including the following:

Universities in Gwalior

Prominent Institutes in Gwalior

Gwalior has five Kendriya Vidyalayas (managed by the Ministry of Human Resource Development, Government Of India), several engineering and technological institutes, and more than thirty affiliated engineering colleges.

The Scindia School, a boarding school for boys, and all India ranked 3rd among other IPSC Boarding schools by the Education World, Scindia Kanya Vidyalaya (a boarding school for girls), Delhi Public School, Gwalior are also located in Gwalior city. Other notable schools and colleges include No. 1 Air Force School, Gwalior and Kendriya Vidyalaya No. 4, Gwalior.Army Public  School, Gwalior

Economy 

Gwalior is surrounded by three industrial areas – Sitholi, Banmore and Malanpur. All three of these sectors are on NH 75, NH-3 and NH 92 respectively, with Malanpur being the largest. The city once had large manufacturing industries, such as Gwalior Grasim and J.C. MILLS of Birlanagar, but now this sector is left with only one major factory – J.B.Mangharam Ltd. The important industries in the other sectors are dairy, chemical, manufacturing, and textiles. Handicraft and small industries are also found. Gwalior is also an important historical and tourism sector of the country. Therefore, the tourism sector also puts an effect into the city's economy. Gwalior is one of the CMAs to New Delhi to dissipate the load of urbanization from NCR (see ). Most of the population is involved with trading firms or are self-employed. Many run OMEs and SMEs with Gwalior and Agra as the local market. The city is scattered with coaching institutes and educational institutions which provide employment to a large section of city's population.

Trade fair
 Gwalior Trade Fair was started in 1905 by Maharaja Madho Rao Scindia, King of Gwalior. The Gwalior Trade Fair is an annual trade fair showcasing the economy of Gwalior. It has become the biggest fair of Madhya Pradesh and one of the most colourful fairs of India. It starts in the second week of January and continues until February.

Gwalior Metro and suburbs 
The 2011 census put the population of Gwalior's urban area / metropolitan region, comprising Gwalior and Morar Cantonment, at 1,117,740.

Old town 

It lies at the eastern base of the rock and contains the tomb of the Sufi saints, Khwaja Khanoon and Muhammad Ghaus, erected during the early part of Mughal emperor Akbar’s reign, and the tomb of Mian Tansen, a great singer and one of the 'Nine Jewels' of Akbar's court. A town called by his name Ghauspura situated near the tomb of Mohaommed Ghaus.reold town consisted of some streets and mohallas which are presumed to be 700 to 800 yrs old areas in gwalior which are still backward areas in gwalior due to improper management of new town. these old areas are as follows.

Koteshwar Temple. This temple is a 700 year old temple of Lord Shiva whose shivling was on Gwalior Fort, but when the Mughals conquered it they ordered the shivling thrown out. When the troops did that, the shivling was automatically established in a field below the fort without any harm. Muslim Gazi told the emperor not to harm the shivling. In the late 18th century Scindias built a temple for that shivling, now known as Koteshwar Mahadev.
Baba Kapoor- this place is 500 meters away from Ghas Mandi. This place was named Baba Kapoor because of saint Shah Abdul Gafoor.
Kashi Naresh ki gali- this a 600 year old residential street in Gwalior it was given name as Kashi Naresh ki gali because in the 14th century when the emperor of Kashi was defeated in war he was sent to exile by oppositions at that time Gwalior emperor and Kashi's emperor were good friends when Kashi's emperor told Gwalior's emperor whole story, emperor gave him an entire street for living at that time which is now known as Kashi Naresh ki Gali. their family even now resides there in Kashi Naresh ki gali in Rajaji Ka Bada. (Meanings: naresh = king = rajaji; gali = street in Hindi language; bada = big area.)

Subcity 

The name of Lashkar is a Persian word meaning 'army' or 'camp', as this was originally the camp, and later the permanent capital, of the Scindia dynasty of Gwalior state. Lashkar was the capital of Madhya Bharat from 1950 to 1956.

Jiwaji Chowk is the central focus of Lashkar, with a large square, a former opera house, banks, tea, coffee and juice stands and a municipal market building. Thriving bazaars surround the chowk. Many jewellery shops are situated near Jayaji Chowk, also known as Maharaj Bada. A source of water for the city is Tighra Dam, built on the Saank river 20 km to the north. The Gajra Raja Medical College, founded in 1946 by the Maharaja Jiwaji Rao Scindia and the Maharani Vijayaraje Scindia, is situated in Lashkar on Palace Road, near Katora Taal, together with a group of hospitals.
Jai Vilas Palace, patterned on the French palace of Versailles, is located here.

Morar Cantonment 
It was formerly a British military cantonment. Morar is generally considered a rural farming town. The area is known as the "green part" of Gwalior because much of the area is still rural.

Morar was the scene of the most serious uprising in Central India. On 1 June 1858, Jayajirao led his forces to Morar to fight a rebel army led by Tatya Tope, Rani Lakshmibai and Rao Sahib. This army had 7,000 infantry, 4,000 cavalry and 12 guns while he had only 1,500 cavalry, his bodyguard of 600 men and 8 guns. In this attack, the rebel cavalry took the guns and most of the Gwalior forces except the bodyguard went over to the rebels (some deserted). The Maharaja and the remainder fled without stopping until they reached the British garrison at Agra. By 1900 it had become a centre for local trade and had an important training industry, with a population of 19,179 in 1901.

The Sun Temple is situated in Morar at Residency Road.

The cantonment area makes up a large area of Morar which contains official residences for the Indian Army. It has many canteens for Army personnel. Saint Paul's School and Pragati Vidyapeeth School are nearby. There is an air force base in the Pinto Park region.

Thatipur 

Thatipur is said to have got its name from State Army Unit 34, which once resided there. Gandhi Road divides Thatipur into two areas. Morar at one end of the road and Balwant Nagar on the other.

Thatipur primarily consists of residential areas like Darpan Colony, Madhav Rao Scindhiya Enclave, the government blocks, Vivek Nagar, and Suresh Nagar. Places of note are the Dwarikadhish Mandir, Bhagwan colony, Tomar building, Chauhan Pyaau (The Chauhan family), Galla Kothar, Ramkrishna Aashram, Saraswati Nagar, Govindpuri, Gayatri Vihar, Shakti Vihar, Shakuntalapuri, Dushyant Nagar, Shanti Vihar, and Mayur market along with Sai Baba Mandir in Shakti Vihar colony.

Healthcare 
The prominent hospitals of Gwalior include Gajara Raja Medical College and the associated J.A. Hospital, Kamla Raja Hospital, Sahara Hospital, Mascot Hospital, BIMR Hospital, Cancer Hospital & Research Institute and many private doctor clinics. The Cancer Hospital & Research Institute is a nationally acclaimed medical centre in Oncology. There is also a charitable hospital named SATCH (Shri Anandpur Trust Charitable Hospital) which provides free treatment. There is a government Ayurvedic college and a private homoeopathic college (Vasundhara Raje Homoeopathic Medical College) which is run by the Biochemic and Homoeopathic Association of Gwalior, also providing health care education and services.

Future developments 
Gwalior West is being developed as a "Counter Magnet" project with funding support from the National Capital Region. It has been introduced to increase investment in education, industry and real estate. This is hoped to counteract the closing of manufacturers such as Hotline, Cimmco and Grasim Gwalior.

The Gwalior Master plan launched by the local collector and municipal corporation initiates to improve the basic civic infrastructure of the city to meet the growing population of the city as well as to make the city beautiful for tourists.

Architecture

Gwalior Fort 

At the heart of Gwalior is Gwalior Fort of the Tomara dynasty. This structure was reputed to be one of the most structurally sound forts of India, having been improved by Raja Man Singh Tomar where a previous structure existed. It occupies an isolated rock outcrop. The hill is steepened to make it virtually unscalable and is surrounded by high walls which enclose buildings from several periods. The old town of Gwalior lies at the eastern base of the fortress. Lashkar, founded by Daulat Rao Scindia, formerly a separate town that originated as a military camp, lies to the south, and Morar, also a formerly separate town, lies to the east. Gwalior, Lashkar and Morar are part of the Gwalior Municipal Corporation.

The Fort, popularly called "the Gibraltar of India", overlooks the city. The Emperor Babur reputedly described it as "the pearl in the necklace of the forts of Hind". This fort's architecture is unique. It displays a Chinese influence on Indian architecture, as Chinese dragons have been crafted at the hilt of the pillars. This influence was due to trade between China and India at the time of the fort's construction.

After the death of Sher Shah Suri in 1545, who was ruling North India at that time, his son Islam Shah shifted his capital from Delhi to Gwalior and constructed 'Sher Shah Mandir' (or 'Sher Shah Fort') in his father's memory. Islam Shah operated from Gwalior until his death in 1553. Islam Shah had appointed the Hindu warrior 'Hemu' or Hem Chandra Vikramaditya as his Prime Minister in Sher Shah Fort for the first time, who later on became the Hem Chandra Vikramaditya king at Delhi and established 'Hindu Raj' in North India.

In the east of the city are two examples of early Mughal architecture: the mausoleum of the 16th century Sufi Saint Ghous Mohammed and the tomb of Mian Tansen, a singer and one of the 'Nine Jewels' of the Mughal Emperor Akbar's court. Right next to them is the Gujari Mahal, built by Tomar Rajput King Man Singh Tomar on demand of his consort Gujar princess Mrignayani.
Close to the heart of the city is Jai Vilas Palace of the Scindia dynasty, patterned on the palace of Versailles. It combines Tuscan, Italian and Corinthian styles of architecture.
Historically and architecturally, Gwalior is interesting first as an ancient seat of Jain worship; second for its example of palace architecture of the Hindu period between 1486 and 1516; and third as an historic fortress. Many historical places are found near the Dabra-Bhitarwar Road. Prior to the founding of Gwalior, the region was also known by its ancient name of Gopasetra. Gwalior had an institutional seat of the Bhattarakas of Kashtha Sangh and later Mula Sangh.

Gopachal 

Gopachal Parvat is situated on the mountainous terrain at the slopes of Gwalior Fort. Gopachal Parvat contains unique statues of Jain Tirthankaras. There is a series of 26 Jain statues in a single line. Built between 1398 and 1536 by Tomar kings, these Jain Tirthankar statues are one of a kind in architecture.

Siddhachal Caves 

Jain rock-cut sculptures of Siddhachal Caves – A striking part of the Jain remains at Gwalior is a series of caves or rock-cut sculptures, excavated in the rock on all sides, and numbering nearly a hundred, great and small. Most of them are mere niches to hold statues, though some are cells that may have been originally intended for residences. According to inscriptions, they were all excavated within a short period of about thirty-three years, between 1441 and 1474. One of the colossal figures is 57 ft (17 m) high, taller than any other in northern India.

Sas-Bahu Temple 

Sas-Bahu Temple, a 9th-century shrine, Sas-Bahu temple in the fort allures not only the devotees but also the tourists with its artistic value. Despite what its name may suggest, these temples are not dedicated to Sas (mother-in-law) and Bahu (daughter-in-law) but rather the short form of Shashtra Bahu, another name for Lord Vishnu. These temples situated adjacent to each other and the larger one is elaborately decorated with carvings and sculptures. The roof of the larger temple is adorned with a lotus carving.

Teli ka mandir 

Teli Ka Mandir (Telangana Mandir) – A structure of about 100 feet, Teli Ka Mandir in Gwalior Fort distinguishes itself from the other compositions of its time because of its unique architecture. The temple bears a close resemblance to the temple of Prathihara Vishnu, and is filled with images of coiled serpents, passionate couples, river goddesses, and a flying Garuda. The temple architecture follows the Indo-Aryan and Nagara styles and is believed to be among the oldest constructions in the fort. The Telikā Mandir, or 'oil-man's temple', owes its name to Teli, a term for an oil grinder or oil dealer. Many suggestions have been put forward to explain this name historically, but in fact the name is not old, the temple being used for processing oil before the British occupied the fort and used the building, albeit temporarily, as a coffee shop. The Telikā Mandir is the loftiest temple among all the buildings in Gwalior Fort with a height of about 30 meters. The temple consists of a garba griha, that is, sanctum proper for the deity, and an antarala to enter into the temple. It can be approached by a flight of steps provided on the eastern side. The most striking feature of the temple is the wagon-vaulted roof, a form used over rectangular shrines which normally accommodated a row of Mother Goddesses. The goddesses from the interior vanished centuries ago and have not been traced. The exterior walls of the temple are decorated with sculptures, many of which are damaged; the niches, shaped like temples, are empty. The building carries a dedicatory inscription to the goddess in a niche on the southern side, but otherwise does not have any history. The architectural style points to a date in the late 8th Century. The entrance gateway on the eastern side is a later addition of the British period, made by Major Keith in 1881. It was built as a way of saving various historic pillars and other pieces no longer in their original context.

Other monuments 
 Gurudwara Daata Bandi Chhorh- Gwalior Fort also has the Gurudwara, built in the memory of the sixth Sikh, Guru Har Gobind. This Gurudwara is particularly large and grand, built entirely of marble with coloured glass decorating the main building. Recital of the Guru Granth Sahib takes place here and Mughal kings used to visit Gwalior regularly. There is a Gurdwara that was converted to a mandir of "kalli devi" and process is on to take it back by Sikhs.
 Municipality Museum, is situated a little distance from Rani Lakshmibai's tomb.
 Modern 5D is Madhya Pradesh's first multi-dimensional theatre launched in the 2011 trade fair of Gwalior. It was built by Gwalior's leading enterprise Modern Techno Projects (P) Ltd. Modern 5D is recognised as India's first own multi-dimensional theatre.
 Shyam Vatika is a banquet hall which has the world's largest indoor mural, as recognised by Guinness World Records.
 Adhyatma Niketan is an important ashram near Gwalior Fort.
 Within the fort are some marvels of medieval architecture. The 15th century Gujari Mahal is a monument to the love of Raja Mansingh Tomar for his Gujar Queen, Mrignayani. The outer structure of Gujari Mahal has survived in an almost total state of preservation; the interior has been converted into an archaeological museum housing rare antiquities, some of them dating back to the 1st century A.D. Many of these have been defaced by the iconoclastic Mughals.

Jai Vilas Mahal

Also called Jai Vilas Palace, is the residential palace turned museum of the Maratha rulers of Gwalior – the Scindias. The palace has notable collections of antiques. The museum is one of the largest in Madhya Pradesh and has the world's largest chandelier  and the complex is a mixture of British and Hindu architecture.
The palace was constructed in 1874 as an attempt to bring the palace of Versailles to Gwalior.

Tombs and Chatris of historic importance

 Chatris of Scindias is situated close to the city near Achaleshwar temple and is the burial place for the Scindias who ruled the city for numerous years. Designated persons like Maharaja Madhavrao Scindia, Vijayaraje Scindia and His Highness Jivajirao Scindia were cremated here.
 Tansen's tomb: Gwalior is the birthplace of the musician Tansen. He was one of the "Nine Gems of Akbar".
 Gaus Mohammad's tomb: The tombs of Great Gaus Mohammad and Tansen are situated on the same territory.
 Tomb of Rani Lakshmibai, a famous freedom fighter, at Phoolbag area. It is here where the she died in 1858 fighting against the British. It is also her burial place.

Sun Temple
Designed as a facsimile of the Sun temple of Konark in Odisha, the temple was sponsored and built in the 1980s by the Birla family.

The temple is located in a serene ambience and a well-maintained garden within the temple premises is very attractive. This holy temple draws the locals and tourists alike who gather here to render their prayers. Before the temple was built the gardens had the name Tapovan. The gardens were the location of an ill-fated attempt to introduce african lions by the Maharaja of Gwalior State.

Notable people

 Abha Parmar, actress 
 Jyotiraditya Scindia
 Madhavrao Scindia
 Jiwajirao Scindia
 Madho Rao Scindia
 Jayaji Rao Scindia
 Jankoji Rao Scindia II
 Daulat Rao Sindhia
 Mahadaji Shinde
 Amjad Ali Khan, sarod player and musician
 Atal Bihari Vajpayee, former Prime Minister of India
 Javed Akhtar, famous poet, lyricist and writer, born in Gwalior
 Bihari Lal, famous Hindi poet 
 Kartik Aaryan, actor, born in Gwalior
 Sharad Kelkar, actor, born in Gwalior
 Piyush Mishra, Indian film and theatre actor, music director, lyricist, singer, scriptwriter.
 Mamta Sharma, singer [Munni Badnam, Fevicol se etc.], born in Gwalior
 Ganesh Shankar Vidyarthi, famous Hindi writer, born in Gwalior
 Nida Fazli, famous Urdu writer and poet
 Roop Singh, Indian hockey player and Olympian
 Shivendra Singh, Indian national hockey player, born and lives in Gwalior
 Tansen, court musician of the Mughal emperor Akbar

 Narendra Singh Tomar
 Pran Kumar Sharma, cartoonist and comic creator of Chacha Chaudhary fame moved here after the Partition
 lior
 Krishnarao Shankar Pandit, noted musician of the Gwalior gharana
 Meet Bros, the musician duo hail from Gwalior.
 Pawan karan, Noted Indian major Hindi poet and writer.
 Meeta Pandit, famous musician of Gwalior Gharana

 Harshvardhan Rane, Telugu and Bollywood actor
 Kushal Tandon, Indian television actor. He did his schooling at Scindia School in Gwalior

 Navniti Prasad Singh, former Chief Justice of Kerala High Court
 Shifa Gwaliori, Indian Urdu poet
 Muhammad Ghawth, Indian Sufi saint and author
Radhika Veena Sadhika, world's first woman vichitra veena player.

References

External links

 Official Website of Gwalior
R. Nath Mughal Architecture Image Collection, Images from Gwalior - University of Washington Digital Collection

 
Metropolitan cities in India
Articles containing potentially dated statements from 2011
All articles containing potentially dated statements
Former capital cities in India
Cities in Madhya Pradesh